The Branagan Cup is a chess cup competition, played between the teams made up of players from clubs that played in the Armstrong Cup and Heidenfeld Trophy, the top two leagues of the Leinster leagues, in Ireland. It is played after the completion of the Leinster Leagues and run by the Leinster Chess Union. Named after Mai Branagan a long time member of Rathmines Chess club and contributor to Irish Chess.

Winners
 1974 - University College Dublin
 1975 - University College Dublin
 1977 - Dundrum
 1978 - Rathfarnham (Yellow House)
 1979 - Rathfarnham
 1980 - Raheny
 1981 - Raheny
 1982 - Raheny
 1983 - Raheny
 1984 - Raheny
 1985 - Dundrum
 1986 - Kevin Barry
 1987 - Dundrum
 1988 - Phibsboro
 1989 - Dun Laoghaire
 1990 - Dun Laoghaire
 1991 - Phibsboro
 1994 - No Competition
 1995 - Crumlin
 1996 - Crumlin
 1997 - St. Benildus
 1998 - Bray/Greystones
 1999 - Bray/Greystones (B)
 2000 - Dublin
 2001 - Phibsboro
 2002 - Phibsboro
 2003 - Dún Laoghaire (B)
 2004 - Phibsboro
 2005 - Rathmines
 2006 - Phibsboro
 2007 - Phibsboro
 2008 - Phibsboro
 2009 - Bray/Greystones
 2010 - Rathmines
 2011 - Elm Mount
 2012 - Elm Mount
 2013 - Elm Mount
 2014 - Elm Mount
 2015 - Gonzaga
 2016 - No Competition
 2017 -
 2018 - No Competition

References

Chess in Ireland
Chess competitions